Ioana Oegar-Toderaș (born 1987), known professionally as JJ and Geneva, is a Romanian-born American singer, rapper and songwriter. She is best known for her 2010 collaboration with Romanian singer Corina, "No Sleepin," which was a Top 10 hit in Poland and Romania.

Early life
Geneva was born in Hunedoara, Romania in 1987. She moved to the United States at the age of 5, spending time in Washington, Manhattan, and Virginia. She returned to Romania at the age of 15.

Career
Geneva was noticed on SoundCloud by Snoop Dogg, who featured her on a mixtape.

She collaborated with Corina on the song “No Sleepin’” in 2010. It was a Top 10 hit in Poland and Romania. A cover version of it by the German girl group LaViVe also was a Top 20 hit in Germany and Austria, and a Top 30 hit in Switzerland. At the 2011 Romanian Music Awards, the song was nominated in the categories “Best Female” and “Best Video.”

As JJ, she also collaborated with Romanian singer Elena Gheorghe on the song “Pana Dimineata,” (“Until Morning”) which premiered at the 2013 Media Music Awards.

Geneva collaborated with Corina on another song, “Superstar,” which was released in 2020.

Geneva was the first Romanian hip-hop artist to be signed to Swedish record label X-Level Studios (formerly EMI Studios and Abbey Road Studios). She has also worked with other labels such as HaHaHa Production.

Discography

Extended plays

Singles

As lead artist

As featured artist

As songwriter

Awards and nominations

References 

Romanian singer-songwriters
21st-century Romanian women singers
21st-century Romanian singers
Romanian rappers
American women rappers
1987 births
American women hip hop singers
American women songwriters
American women singer-songwriters
Living people
21st-century American women singers
21st-century American singers
Romanian emigrants to the United States